Arturo Pacini (22 November 1925 – 8 December 2011) was an Italian politician who served as Senator for four legislatures (1972–1987) and Mayor of Lucca (1990–1993).

References

1925 births
2011 deaths
Mayors of Lucca
Politicians from Lucca
Christian Democracy (Italy) politicians
Senators of Legislature VI of Italy
Senators of Legislature VII of Italy
Senators of Legislature VIII of Italy
Senators of Legislature IX of Italy
20th-century Italian politicians